Peter Spicker House is a historic home located at Stouchsburg, Marion Township, Berks County, Pennsylvania.  It is a native limestone dwelling with first section was built about 1740, with the central portion added about 1750, and the eastern section about 1800.  It is reflective of the transition from the Germanic to the Georgian style.  The oldest section is  stories, three bays wide.  The central section is  stories and also three bays wide, with a gable and pent roof.  The eastern section is also  stories, six bays wide, with a gable roof.  Also on the property is a late-18th century, stone Pennsylvania German bank barn.

It was listed on the National Register of Historic Places in 1983.  It is located in the Stouchsburg Historic District.

Gallery

References

Houses on the National Register of Historic Places in Pennsylvania
Georgian architecture in Pennsylvania
Houses completed in 1800
Houses in Berks County, Pennsylvania
National Register of Historic Places in Berks County, Pennsylvania